The office of Lord Clerk Register is the oldest surviving Great Officer of State in Scotland, with origins in the 13th century. It historically had important functions in relation to the maintenance and care of the public records of Scotland. Today these duties are administered by the Keeper of the National Records of Scotland and the Keeper of the Registers of Scotland.

History of Office

Kingdom of Scotland 
The first usage of the office appears in 1288, as Clerk of the Rolls of the Kings Chapel. It later was termed in 1291 as 'Keeper of the Rolls of the Kingdom of Scotland' After the Wars of Independence, a similar office appeared with the title of 'Clerk of the Rolls', which was altered about 1373 to 'Clerk of the Rolls and Register', the 'register' being the record of charters (ie: grants of land or titles of nobility) made under the Great Seal.

While the Clerk of Rolls and Register was originally responsible for the records of Chancery, Parliament and Exchequer, but as the central civil court developed out of the king's council in the fifteenth century, he became responsible for its records too, and from 1483 he was 'Clerk of the Rolls, Register and Council'5. This court later became the Court of Session.

By the fifteenth century, the Clerk Register ranked as an officer of state with a seat in Parliament and the council. By the sixteenth and seventeenth centuries more honorific styles such as 'Lord Register' or 'Lord Clerk Register' came to be adopted when describing the Clerk of Rolls. The Clerk Register remained responsible for the records of Parliament and its committees and commissions, the Exchequer, and the Court of Session (representing the judicial side of the old council). From the later sixteenth century statutory additions were made to his functions as new legal registers were put under his control, the most important being the Register of Sasines in 1617 with the passage of the Registration Act 1617.

By the time of the Union with the Kingdom of England in 1707, the office was known as the 'Clerk of the Registers and Rolls of the council, Session and Exchequer, and of all Commissions, Parliaments and Conventions of Estates'. Since 1488 appointments to the office have been made by the Sovereign by commission under the Great Seal.

Kingdom of Great Britain 
The Treaty of Union in 1707 provided for the preservation of public records; and the office was also entrusted the election and management of the sixteen Scottish peers to the House of Lords in the new British parliament, with two Clerks of Session commissioned by him to assist. However without the sitting of a Scottish Parliament or Scottish Privy Council, the Lord Clerk Register's duties fell greatly, remaining only entrusted with the court and other legal records.

United Kingdom of Great Britain and Ireland, later the United Kingdom of Great Britain and Northern Ireland 
In 1806, a Royal Warrant established the office of Deputy Clerk Register, effectively reducing the duties of the Lord Clerk Registers to an honorary title. In 1817, the Public Offices (Scotland) Act 1817 (c 64) incorporated the offices of Lord Clerk Register with HM Keeper of the Signet. In 1818, a Royal Commission entrusted the officers of state, including the Lord Clerk Register for the time being, with the custody of the Scottish honours.

In 1854, the Deputy Clerk Register's duties were also extended to the care of the records of births, deaths and marriages under the Registration of Births, Deaths and Marriages (Scotland) Act 1854, which established the General Registry Office of Births, Deaths and Marriages.

The Lord Clerk Register (Scotland) Act 1879 provided that the office of Lord Clerk Register would remain as a ceremonial Great Officer of State, with all duties passing to the Deputy Clerk Register. However, the Lord Clerk Register did retain an important function, responsibility for organising the election of peers of Scotland to the House of Lords, until the passage of the Peerage Act 1963.

In 1928, the office of Deputy Clerk Register was abolished by the Reorganisation of Offices (Scotland) Act 1928,  becoming the Keeper of the Registers and Records of Scotland. However, it came to be recognised that the keeping of records and the keeping of registers was too cumbersome a task to be entrusted to a single official.

In 1948, the Public Registers and Records (Scotland) Act 1948 provided that the Registers of Scotland and Records of Scotland were to be split into two separate government organisations with two separate officials: (1) the Keeper of the Registers of Scotland and (2) the Keeper of the Records of Scotland. These individuals now run (1) the Registers of Scotland and (2) the National Records of Scotland.

Present 
In 1996, the Commissioners of the Regalia were given additional responsibility for the Stone of Destiny, or the Stone of Scone, under another Royal Warrant, when the Stone was moved to Edinburgh. The Scottish Executive announced on 27 April 2007 that the Queen had appointed Lord Mackay of Clashfern to the office of Lord Clerk Register, replacing the Earl of Wemyss and March. The Lord Clerk Register remains a Commissioner for the Regalia and the Keeper of the Signet by virtue of the 1879 Act. As such the office is largely ceremonial. The Lord Clerk Register takes in the order of precedence in Scotland after the First Minister (as Keeper of the Great Seal) and the Lord Justice-General, and before the Lord Advocate and Lord Justice-Clerk

Office holders 
incomplete list

 William, Bishop of St Andrews
 Simon de Quincy
 Nicolas, Clericus to Malcolm IV
 William de Bosch, Hugo, Galfrid, and Gregory, all served Alexander II
 1253: William Capellanus and Alexander de Carrick
 1323: Robert de Dunbar
 John Gray, appointed by Robert II
 1426: John Schives, decretorum director
 1440: Richard Craig, Vicar of Dundee
 1442: George Shoriswood, Rector of Culter
 1449: Sir John Methven
 1450: John Arouse, Archdeacon of Glasgow
 1455: Nicol Otterburn
 1466: Fergus McDowall
 1471: David Guthrie of that Ilk
 1473: John Layng, Rector of Newlands, Glasgow
 1477: Alexander Inglis, afterwards Deacon of Dunkeld
 1482: Patrick Leith, Canon of Glasgow
 1482: Alexander Scot, Rector of Wigton
 1488: William Hepburn, Vicar of Linlithgow
 1489: Richard Murehead, Deacon of Glasgow
 1492: John Fraser, Rector of Restalrig
 1497: Walter Drummond, Deacon of Dunblane
 1500: Gavin Dunbar, Archdeacon of St Andrews, afterwards Bishop of Aberdeen
 Sir Stephen Lockhart, appointed by James IV
 1531: Sir James Foulis of Colinton
 1548: Sir Thomas Marjoribanks of Ratho
 1554: James MacGill of Nether Rankeillour, Parson of Flisk
 1565: James Balfour of Pittendreich
 1567: James MacGill of Nether Rankeillour
 1577: Alexander of Easter Kennet (d 1594)
 1594-1612: Sir John Skene of Curriehill
 1598: James Skeen, conjunct with his father
 1612: Sir Thomas Hamilton, afterwards 1st Earl of Haddington
 1612: Sir Alexander Hay of Whitburgh, Lord Newton
 1616: Sir George Hay of Netherleiffe
 1622: Sir John Hamilton of Magdalens, brother to the Earl of Haddington
 1632: Sir John Hay, Lord Barra
 1641: Sir Alexander Gibson, Lord Durie, younger of Durie
 1649: Archibald Johnston, Lord Warriston
 1660: Archibald Primrose, Lord Carrington, of Chester (until 1676)
 c1690: Sir Thomas Burnett, 3rd Baronet of Leys
 1696-1702: Charles Douglas, 2nd Earl of Selkirk
 November 1702 - June 1704: Sir James Murray, Lord Philiphaugh
 1704-1705: James Johnston
 April 1705 - July 1708: James Murray, Lord Philiphaugh 
1708-14: David Boyle, 1st Earl of Glasgow
 1714: Archibald Campbell, Earl of Ilay, 3rd Duke of Argyll
 1716: James Graham, 1st Duke of Montrose
 1716: Alexander Hume-Campbell, 2nd Earl of Marchmont, 2nd Lord Polwarth
 1733: Charles Douglas, 2nd Earl of Selkirk
 1739: William Kerr, 3rd Marquess of Lothian
 1756: Alexander Hume Campbell
 1760: James Douglas, 14th Earl of Morton
 1761 Sir Gilbert Elliot, 2nd Baronet

 1768: Lord Frederick Campbell
 1816: Archibald Campbell Colquhoun
 1821: William Dundas
 1841: James Andrew Broun-Ramsay, 1st Marquess of Dalhousie
 1862: Sir William Gibson Craig of Riccarton
 1879: George Frederick Boyle, 6th Earl of Glasgow
 1890: Douglas Beresford Malise Ronald Graham, 5th Duke of Montrose
 1926: John Charles Montagu-Douglas-Scott, 7th Duke of Buccleuch, 9th Duke of Queensberry
 1935: Walter John Francis Erskine, 12th Earl of Mar, 14th Earl of Kellie
 1944: Sidney Herbert Elphinstone, 16th Baron Elphinstone
 1956: Walter John Montagu-Douglas-Scott, 8th Duke of Buccleuch, 10th Duke of Queensberry
 1974: Francis David Charteris, 12th Earl of Wemyss and March
 2007: James Mackay, Baron Mackay of Clashfern

References

See also
 Registrar General for Scotland
 Lord Justice Clerk

Great Officers of State of Scotland
Positions within the British Royal Household
Scots law formal titles
Political office-holders in Scotland
Lists of office-holders in Scotland
Scots law